Frontier Fugitives is a 1945 American Western film directed by Harry L. Fraser and written by Elmer Clifton. The film stars Tex Ritter, Dave O'Brien, Guy Wilkerson, Lorraine Miller, I. Stanford Jolley and Jack Ingram. The film was released on September 1, 1945, by Producers Releasing Corporation.

Plot

Cast          
Tex Ritter as Tex Haines
Dave O'Brien as Dave Wyatt
Guy Wilkerson as Panhandle Perkins
Lorraine Miller as Ellen Williams
I. Stanford Jolley as Frank Sneed
Jack Ingram as Allen Fain
Frank Ellis as Mert Donner
Jack Hendricks as Jim Gar

See also
The Texas Rangers series:
 The Rangers Take Over (1942)
 Bad Men of Thunder Gap (1943)
 West of Texas (1943)
 Border Buckaroos (1943)
 Fighting Valley (1943)
 Trail of Terror (1943)
 The Return of the Rangers (1943)
 Boss of Rawhide (1943)
 Outlaw Roundup (1944)
 Guns of the Law (1944)
 The Pinto Bandit (1944)
 Spook Town (1944)
 Brand of the Devil (1944)
 Gunsmoke Mesa (1944)
 Gangsters of the Frontier (1944)
 Dead or Alive (1944)
 The Whispering Skull (1944)
 Marked for Murder (1945)
 Enemy of the Law (1945)
 Three in the Saddle (1945)
 Frontier Fugitives (1945)
 Flaming Bullets (1945)

References

External links
 

1945 films
1940s English-language films
American Western (genre) films
1945 Western (genre) films
Producers Releasing Corporation films
Films directed by Harry L. Fraser
American black-and-white films
1940s American films